Route 153 is a two-lane north/south highway in Quebec, Canada, which starts in Yamachiche at the junction of Autoroute 40 and ends in Lac-aux-Sables at the junction of Route 363.

Municipalities along Route 153

 Yamachiche
 Saint-Barnabé
 Saint-Boniface-de-Shawinigan
 Shawinigan - (Shawinigan / Grand-Mère / Saint-Georges-de-Champlain)
 Hérouxville
 Saint-Tite
 Sainte-Thècle
 Lac-aux-Sables

Major intersections

See also
 List of Quebec provincial highways

References

External links 
 Provincial Route Map (Courtesy of the Quebec Ministry of Transportation) 
 Route 153 on Google Maps

153
Transport in Shawinigan